Mortonia may refer to:

Mortonia (echinoderm), a genus of sand dollars in the family Echinocyamidae
Mortonia (plant), a genus of plants in the family Celastraceae